Icelandic refers to anything of, from, or related to Iceland and may refer to:
Icelandic people
Icelandic language
Icelandic alphabet
Icelandic cuisine

See also 
 Icelander (disambiguation)
 Icelandic Airlines, a predecessor of Icelandair
 Icelandic horse, a breed of domestic horse
 Icelandic sheep, a breed of domestic sheep
 Icelandic Sheepdog, a breed of domestic dog
 Icelandic cattle, a breed of cattle
 Icelandic chicken, a breed of chicken

Language and nationality disambiguation pages